Raimond Põder (born 3 January 1903, date of death unknown) was an Estonian footballer. He played in one match for the Estonia national football team in 1920. He was also part of Estonia's squad for the football tournament at the 1924 Summer Olympics, but he did not play in any matches.

References

External links
 

1903 births
Year of death missing
Estonian footballers
Estonia international footballers
Association football midfielders
Footballers from Tallinn
JK Tallinna Kalev players
Footballers at the 1924 Summer Olympics
Olympic footballers of Estonia